Martyn James Booty (born 30 May 1971) is an English former professional footballer who played as a defender. He made more than 300 appearances in the Football League for Coventry City, Crewe Alexandra, Reading, Southend United, Chesterfield and Huddersfield Town. He had two spells as Assistant Manager of Hyde United F.C.

His son Regan plays for Notts County.

Career

Early career
Born in Kirby Muxloe, Leicestershire, but grew up in Anstey with his parents Nell and John, and brother Michael. He started his football career as a trainee at Coventry City, but struggled to break into the first team.

The Football League
After leaving Highfield Road, he moved to Crewe Alexandra, Reading, Southend United and Chesterfield. In 2003, Peter Jackson, who had just been re-appointed manager of Huddersfield Town, brought Booty in to help with the club's revitalisation following two relegations in three seasons, but he picked up an injury and only played four games during that season. At the end of the season, Jackson appointed Booty to the coaching staff, a role which he held until May 2008.

Non-league
At the beginning of the 2008–09 season, he joined Northern Premier League side Curzon Ashton as a player, moving on first to Salford City and then Buxton. Before the 2009–10 season, Booty rejoined Curzon Ashton as assistant manager.

In May 2011, Booty followed Gary Lowe to Hyde, where he became Lowe's assistant manager, signing a one-year contract at the club.

References

External links
 

1971 births
Living people
English footballers
People from Kirby Muxloe
Footballers from Leicestershire
Association football fullbacks
Coventry City F.C. players
Crewe Alexandra F.C. players
Reading F.C. players
Southend United F.C. players
Chesterfield F.C. players
Huddersfield Town A.F.C. players
Curzon Ashton F.C. players
Salford City F.C. players
Buxton F.C. players
Premier League players
English Football League players
Hyde United F.C. managers
English football managers